Ong's Hat is one of the earliest Internet-based secret history conspiracy theories. It was created as a piece of collaborative fiction by four core individuals, dating back to the 1980s, although the membership propagating the tale changed over time. Ong's Hat is often cited as the first ARG on many lists of alternate reality games.

The characters were largely based in the ghost town of Ong's Hat, New Jersey, hence the name of the project.

History
The threads of the story can be traced back as far as the 1980s on bulletin board systems, old xerox mail art networks and early zines. The aim was to create a fictional story line, and embed it in various media cultures to establish backstory. It may have started as an in-joke, or the first alternate reality game (ARG), a work of transmedia storytelling or as a memetic experiment, to see how far the meme could spread or a combination of all of the above. The story eventually used print, radio, television and digital mediums (CD-ROM, DVD, Internet, BBS) in its dissemination.

The initial ground rules acknowledged the possibility that such an experiment could end up going down darker paths, and they specifically ruled out Ong's Hat being used for cult-like activity. Even though it is a fiction, the tale may be based on earlier works.

Joseph Matheny eventually concluded the project. GamesTM magazine wrote that "Ong’s Hat was more of an experiment in transmedia storytelling than what we would now consider to be an ARG but its DNA – the concept of telling a story across various platforms and new media – is evident in every alternate reality game that came after."

In 2002, Lego created an ARG for their line of toys for Canadian children's TV series Galidor that featured some elements of the Ong's Hat story.

Plot
The Ong's Hat narrative is told in the form of conspiracy theories surrounding a group of renegade Princeton professors who had conducted quantum physics and chaos theory experiments to discover a new theory for dimensional travel using a device called "the egg", and were camped out in a parallel world. Their story is introduced through two documents, Incunabula: A Catalog of Rare Books, Manuscripts & Curiosa, Conspiracy Theory, Frontier Science & Alternative Worlds and Ong's Hat: Gateway to the Dimensions.

The story is said to begin in 1978 when a man named Wali Ford bought over 200 acres of forested land and set up an ashram. This ashram was built for seekers of spirituality, politics, tantra, and psychopharmacology. The ashram was a place for Princeton physicists, among other accredited scientists, to perform experiments involving interdimensional travel. It was rumored that they were trying to train the human mind to manipulate quantum physics and reality itself.

A device called The Egg was developed in the late 1980s by these scientists and physicists. This device was created as a variation of a sensory deprivation chamber, and it was used to help them determine when a wave becomes a particle. However, during a test one day, something unexpected happened: it disappeared. A young man who was inside the Egg when it disappeared explained that in the seven minutes the Egg was gone, he had traveled to another alternate dimension of the Earth. This other planet was exactly the same as Earth, but did not contain human life.

Throughout the years, they continued their experiments. However, when military efforts threatened the research being done by these physicists and scientists, they had to move their site somewhere else. Piece by piece, they moved their ashram to the other Earth. They left behind only the house where the gateway between worlds is held. The only time the people who live in the ashram return is when they need to restock supplies.

See also
 Creepypasta
 The Blair Witch Project
 Church of the SubGenius
 lonelygirl15
 Fakelore
 SCP Foundation
 The Slender Man

Notes

Further reading

External links
 Ong's Hat: The Beginning, a range of materials to download including the original book as well as graphic novels and CDs.
 Gizmodo- Ong's Hat: The Early Internet Conspiracy Game That Got Too Real
 Slate- Decoder Ring: The Incunabula Papers Slate podcast feature about the origins of the Ong's Hat Project 
 The Surprising Online Life of Legends
 GAMES™ INVESTIGATES ALTERNATE REALITY GAMES AND WHAT THE FUTURE HAS IN STORE FOR THE CURIOUS EXPERIMENT
 An interview with John Tukey at Princeton University on 11 April 1984 Includes references to an earlier Ong's Hat story

Transmedia storytelling
Alternate reality games
Internet hoaxes